The Pelagonia Statistical Region is one of eight statistical regions of North Macedonia. It is located in southwestern part of the country along the eponymous plain. It borders Greece and Albania. Internally, it borders the Southwestern and Vardar statistical regions.

Municipalities

Pelagonia statistical region is divided into 9 municipalities:

Bitola
Demir Hisar
Dolneni
Krivogaštani 
Kruševo
Mogila
Novaci
Prilep
Resen

Demographics

Population
The population of the Pelagonia Statistical Region is 238,136 citizens, or 11.8% of the population of the Republic of North Macedonia, according to the census of 2002.

Ethnicities
The largest ethnic group in the region are Macedonians.

See also
Pelagonia

References 
 

Statistical regions of North Macedonia
 
Pelagonia